Yacob Mulugetta is a British-African professor of Energy and Development Policy and the Director of MPA programme at the Department of Science, Technology, Engineering & Public Policy, University College London. He is a member of African Academy of Sciences (ACPC) He was the Lead Coordinating  Author of the 5th Assessment Report of the  Intergovernmental Panel on Climate Change by Energy Systems chapter and he is one of the founding members of the African Climate Policy Centre (ACPC)

Research Areas 
Yacob's research revolves around three interwoven areas which are; energy systems and development; energy systems and climate change; and political economy of low carbon development.

References 

British scientists
British engineers
Climate activists
British academics
Living people
Year of birth missing (living people)
Fellows of the African Academy of Sciences